Hunterganj (Shaligram Ramnarayapur), is a historic town in the Chatra subdivision of the Chatra district, Jharkhand, India.

Etymology
The town is now named after Shaligram Singh and Ram Narayan Singh, two eminent freedom fighters of Chatra district (then Hazaribagh district).

Geography

Location

Hunterganj is an old town. The nearest railway station is at Gaya and the nearest airport is Gaya Airport. Hunterganj is on NH 99 and stands on the banks of Lilajan River.

Area overview
The map alongside shows that the forests (mark the light shading), covering around 60% of Chatra district, are evenly spread across the district. The map provides links to three CCL operational areas.

Note: The map alongside presents some of the notable locations in the district. All places marked in the map are linked in the larger full screen map.

Civic administration

Police station
Hunterganj police station serves Shaligram Ramnarayanpur CD block.

CD block HQ
Headquarters of Shaligram Ramnarayanpur CD block is at Hunterganj.

Places of Interest
Kauleshwari Temple, one of the shaktipeethas of state situated at Kolhua Hill.
Shri Kolhua Pahad Digambar Jain Teerth Kshetra, the place where Jain tirthankar, Shitalnatha got enlightened. Many temples and a cave related to 4th century are found here.
Gurdwara Guru Singh Sabha Kedli Kalan, a historic place visited by Guru Nanak while his first Udasi tour and Guru Tegh Bahadur while his travel toward east. It also have 200 years old handwritten Guru Granth Sahib.
Jori Pahari Temple, a temple dedicated to Hindu god, Hanuman, situated at Jora Hill in Jora Kalan

Education
R.N.M. College at Hunterganj is affiliated with the Vinoba Bhave University.

References

External links
 Satellite map of Hunterganj
 About Hunterganj

Cities and towns in Chatra district